Nyctemera amicus, the senecio moth, magpie moth or cineraria moth, is a moth of the family Erebidae. The species was first described by Adam White in 1841. It is found in South-east Asia, Oceania, and most of Australia. It can also be found in New Zealand.

The larvae feed on Senecio species including S. linearifolius, S. quadridentatus, S. mikanioides, S. cruentus, and S. scandens. These food plants contain pyrrolizidine alkaloids, making the larvae unpleasant to taste and poisonous to birds.

References

Nyctemerina
Moths of New Zealand
Moths of Australia
Moths of Asia
Moths described in 1841